Jim Knowles (born April 16, 1965) is an American football coach and former player. He is currently the defensive coordinator and linebackers coach at Ohio State University. Knowles served as the head football coach at Cornell University from 2004 to 2009.

Career
A 1987 graduate of Cornell University, Knowles was a defensive end on the Big Red football team. He was elected to Cornell's Sphinx Head Society during his senior year, ultimately graduating with a B.S. in Industrial and Labor Relations in 1987. Prior to receiving the head coach position, Knowles served as an assistant at Cornell, Western Michigan University and the University of Mississippi.

Cornell
From 2004 to 2009, he compiled a 26–34 record as head football coach at Cornell University.

Duke
On December 28, 2009, Knowles was named the defensive coordinator at Duke under head coach David Cutcliffe.  Knowles had previously served as linebackers coach under Cutcliffe while he was head coach at the University of Mississippi (Ole Miss) in 2003.

Oklahoma State
On January 29, 2018, Knowles was hired as the defensive coordinator at Oklahoma State under head coach Mike Gundy, and held the position through the 2021 season. During Knowles' time at Oklahoma State, the Cowboys' defense saw significant statistical improvements. After regressing in areas like opponent points per play and opponent yards per play during Knowles' first season, Oklahoma State's defense improved in each of Knowles' next three seasons. For the 2021 season, Knowles' defense finished top ten in areas such as opponent points per play, opponent points per game, opponent yards per play, opponent yards per game, opponent yards per rush attempt, opponent rushing yards per game, team sack percentage, and sacks per game.

Ohio State
Ohio State Buckeyes coach Ryan Day announced on December 7, 2021 that Knowles had accepted the defensive coordinator position for his team effective January 2, 2022.

Head coaching record

References

External links
 Oklahoma State profile

1965 births
Living people
American football defensive ends
Cornell Big Red football coaches
Cornell Big Red football players
Ohio State Buckeyes football coaches
Oklahoma State Cowboys football coaches
Ole Miss Rebels football coaches
Western Michigan Broncos football coaches
St. Joseph's Preparatory School alumni
Cornell University School of Industrial and Labor Relations alumni
Players of American football from Philadelphia
Coaches of American football from Pennsylvania